HD 124639 is a Be star in the southern constellation of Apus. It has an apparent visual magnitude of 6.42, which makes it a challenge to view with the naked eye even under the best viewing conditions. At that distance, the visual magnitude of the star is diminished by an extinction of 0.17 due to interstellar dust. The star is moving further away with a heliocentric radial velocity of +27 km/s.

This is a B-type main-sequence star with a stellar classification of B8 Ve. The 'e' suffix indicates the presence of emission lines in the spectrum from ejected circumstellar material that is being heated by the host star. At the age of 126 million years, it has completed 96% of its lifespan on the main sequence. Levenhagen and Leister (2006) class it as a B9 IVe star, which would suggest it has already evolved into a subgiant star.

HD 124639 is spinning rapidly with a projected rotational velocity of 237 km/s; the centrifugal force along the equator is equal to 56% of its surface gravity. It has 4.4 times the mass of the Sun and is radiating 676 times the Sun's luminosity from its photosphere at an effective temperature of 12,700 K.

References

External links
 Image HD 124639
 www.site.uottawa.ca

B-type main-sequence stars
Be stars
Apus (constellation)
Durchmusterung objects
124639
070418
5327